National Public Schools, Bangalore is used to collectively refer to the following schools:
 National Public School, Rajajinagar, Bangalore
 National Public School, Indiranagar, Bangalore
 National Public School, Koramangala, Bangalore
 National Academy For Learning, Bangalore
 The International School Bangalore
 National Public School, HSR, Bangalore
 Candor NPS, Tirupathi